Cazu is one of nine parishes (administrative divisions) in Ponga, a municipality within the province and autonomous community of Asturias, in northern Spain.

The population is 187 (INE 2007).

Villages and hamlets
 Ambingue
 Cazu
 Los Lladeros
 Priesca
 Sellañu
 Tribiertu

References

Parishes in Ponga